Belmullet Aerodrome is located  west of Belmullet, a town in County Mayo (Contae Mhaigh Eo), Ireland. This aerodrome is licensed by the Aeronautical Services Department of the Irish Aviation Authority.

Facilities 
The field is part of the community sports ground.

References

External links
 

Airports in the Republic of Ireland
Transport in County Mayo